Bhawanipur is a small hamlet in Mansurchak Block in Begusarai District of Bihar state, India. It comes under Bhawanipur Panchayath.

References

Villages in Begusarai district